This was the first edition of the tournament.

Sander Arends and David Pel won the title after defeating Johannes Härteis and Benjamin Hassan 6–4, 6–3 in the final.

Seeds

Draw

References

External links
 Main draw

Upper Austria Open - Doubles
Upper Austria Open